Walker Whiting Vick (August 16, 1878 - May 12, 1926) was an aide to Woodrow Wilson in 1912 and an officer of the Democratic National Committee. He also served as Receiver General of Customs in the Dominican Republic while it was a US protectorate.

Vick was a resident of Rutherford, New Jersey.

References

1878 births
1926 deaths
People from Rutherford, New Jersey
American expatriates in the Dominican Republic